The 2014 Nagoya Grampus season was Nagoya Grampus' 22nd season in the J.League Division 1 and 32nd overall in the Japanese top flight. It is Akira Nishino's first season as manager after replacing Dragan Stojković in the off-season. They finished the season in 10th place, reaching the Quarter Finals  of the Emperor's Cup whilst failing to progress from the group stages of the J.League Cup.

Squad
As of 6 February 2014

Out on loan

Transfers

Winter

In:

 

 

 

Out:

Summer

In:

Out:

Competitions

J.League

Results summary

Results by round

Results

League table

J.League Cup

Emperor's Cup

Squad statistics

Appearances and goals

|-
|colspan="14"|Players who left Nagoya Grampus during the season:

Goal Scorers

Disciplinary record

References

Nagoya Grampus
Nagoya Grampus seasons